The Won Pat Outdoor Oven is a 20th-century version of a traditional hotnu, or outside oven, on the island of Guam. It is located on a vacant lot off Mansanita Court in Sinajana. Although built out of modern materials, it follows a traditional form that has been in use on Guam since these ovens were introduced by the Spanish in the 17th century. The base of the structure is built of rough limestone and mortar. The interior of the vault is made out of heat-resistant bricks, while the exterior is finished in concrete. When recorded in 2010, its main opening was damaged.

The oven was listed on the National Register of Historic Places in 2010.

See also
 Baza Outdoor Oven
 Paulino Outdoor Oven
 Quan Outdoor Oven
 National Register of Historic Places listings in Guam

References

Buildings and structures on the National Register of Historic Places in Guam
Ovens